Balajnac may refer to:

Balajnac (Despotovac), Serbia
Balajnac (Merošina), Serbia